John Archibald Sinclair, 3rd Viscount Thurso  (born 10 September 1953), known also as John Thurso, is a Scottish businessman, Liberal Democrat politician and hereditary peer who is notable for having served in the House of Lords both before and after a period in the House of Commons. 

Born to the Sinclair family, Lord Thurso was educated at Eton College before entering management roles in the tourism and hospitality industry. He first joined Parliament in the House of Lords as a hereditary peer in 1995 and served until 1999, when he was among the majority of hereditary peers who were removed from Parliament following the House of Lords Act 1999.

Thurso was elected Member of Parliament (MP) for Caithness, Sutherland and Easter Ross at the 2001 general election, becoming the fifth generation of the Sinclair family to represent the Caithness area in the House of Commons. He held the seat until he was defeated at the 2015 general election by the Scottish National Party (SNP) candidate, Paul Monaghan. During his time serving in the Commons, Lord Thurso was chair of the Finance and Services Committee from 2010 to 2015. In 2016, Thurso returned to the House of Lords after winning a by-election to fill a vacancy among the remaining Liberal Democrat hereditary peers. He became chair of VisitScotland in 2016 and later became Lord Lieutenant of Caithness in 2017.

Education and early career

Thurso was born as John Archibald Sinclair to the high-profile Sinclair family and was educated in the Scottish town of Thurso before being educated at Eton College. He joined the Savoy Group as a management trainee in 1972 and, following this, worked for many years in the tourism and hospitality industry. He was a manager at the Lancaster Hotel in Paris (1981–1985) and founding the hotel at Cliveden (1985–1992) before becoming CEO of Granfel Holdings, owners of East Sussex National Golf Course from 1992 to 1995. Finally, from 1995 until his election to Parliament in 2001, he was CEO of the Champneys Group. During his time in this job he featured in the TV documentary Trouble at the Top – Shape up with Lord Thurso.

House of Commons
Following his father's death in 1995, he took his seat in the House of Lords as the 3rd Viscount Thurso where he became spokesman on Tourism and later Food Matters. Thurso spoke many times in the House of Lords in favour of Lords reform. His automatic right as a hereditary peer to sit in the House of Lords was abolished in 1999, and he did not attempt to remain in that capacity. At the 2001 general election, he was elected to the House of Commons as the MP for Caithness, Sutherland and Easter Ross.

He served as Liberal Democrat Scotland spokesperson under Charles Kennedy, but was sacked by Sir Menzies Campbell. He has publicly gone against party policy by declaring his support for nuclear power, and his criticism of 24-hour drinking and wind power.

Lord Thurso was sworn of the Privy Council in 2014. Thurso lost his Caithness, Sutherland and Easter Ross at the 2015 general election to Paul Monaghan of the Scottish National Party (SNP). However, Lord Thurso had a good result in comparison with many Liberal Democrat candidates. Only four Scottish Liberal Democrat candidates were closer to winning their seats, including Alistair Carmichael, who was the only Liberal Democrat candidate to retain his seat at that year's General Election.

Return to the House of Lords and later career 
Following the 2015 general election, Thurso became a board member of the Independent Parliamentary Standards Authority. In April 2016, he won a by-election to a vacancy in the House of Lords following the death of Lord Avebury. He won the support of all of the three members who were eligible to vote. In 2017, Thurso was appointed as Lord Lieutenant of Caithness.

Thurso holds the presidencies of The Tourism Society and the Academy of Food and Wine Service. He is a fellow of Confederation of Tourism and Hospitality (HCIMA) (FIH) and served as its Patron for six years, until June 2003. He was President of the British International Spa Association. On 7 March 2016, it was announced that Lord Thurso would become the chair of VisitScotland.

Personal life 
Thurso comes from a family of Liberal parliamentarians. The former constituency of Caithness and Sutherland had been held by his grandfather, Archibald Sinclair, from 1922 until 1945. Archibald Sinclair was the 1st Viscount Thurso and a Liberal Party leader. Thurso has been married to Marion for 26 years and they have a daughter and two sons. The family live at Thurso, Caithness.

As a patron of the Bluebell Railway 50th Anniversary Appeal, on 24 April 2009, at the railway's Horsted Keynes station Thurso carried out the ceremonial renaming of the Battle of Britain class locomotive named after his grandfather, Sir Archibald Sinclair, Secretary of State for Air during that battle.

Arms

See also
Liberal Democrat Frontbench Team
Clan Sinclair

Notes

References

External links
John Thurso MP official site
Profile at the Liberal Democrats
Profile at the Scottish Liberal Democrats

|-

|-

|-

|-

|-

|-

1953 births
Living people
Liberal Democrats (UK) hereditary peers
Lord-Lieutenants of Caithness
Members of the Privy Council of the United Kingdom
People from Thurso
People educated at Eton College
Scottish businesspeople
Scottish Liberal Democrat MPs
Thurso, John Sinclair, 3rd Viscount
UK MPs 2001–2005
UK MPs 2005–2010
UK MPs 2010–2015
UK MPs who inherited peerages
Hereditary peers elected to the House of Commons
Members of the Parliament of the United Kingdom for Highland constituencies
Scottish people of American descent
John
Thurso
Thurso